Exile is a Canadian thriller film, directed by Jason James and released in 2022. The film stars Adam Beach as Ted Evans, a man who has just been released from prison after serving a five-year sentence for killing a family in a drunk driving accident; however, just before his release he receives a threat from the survivor that his own family will be killed in retaliation, and goes into hiding in order to protect them. However, his wife Sara (Camille Sullivan) believes that the threat was a figment of Ted's imagination, and has tracked him down to convince him to come home.

The film was shot in late 2021 in Powell River, British Columbia. 

It premiered on December 1, 2022 in the Borsos Competition program at the 2022 Whistler Film Festival.

Cast 

 Adam Beach as Ted Evans
 Camille Sullivan as Sarah Evans
 Garry Chalk as Chief Sanders
 Marshall Williams as Cole
 Frances Flanagan as Karen
 Teagan Vincze as Nicole Vasser
 Leah Jacksties as Casey
 Ecstasia Sanders as Officer Riggs
 Jeremy Jones as Inmate
 Carma Sacree as Chatty Woman
 Austin Brock James Johannesson as Sam
 Peyton Roux as Marissa
 Dennis Bouwman as Musician
 Paul Human as Max

Reception 
Rachel West of That Shelf praised the film as a well-made thriller anchored by a strong performance by Beach, writing that "finally given the chance to shine in a lead role worthy of him, Beach makes Ted a man of complex layers and deep secrets. The anguish he feels is palpable, as is the idea that he might harbour even darker secrets. Ted’s reality may not be as it seems, and Beach’s performance, as well as the script, give the viewer room to question if what they see is truly what is happening."

Alex Heeney of Seventh Row gave the film a more mixed review, praising the performances of Beach and Sullivan but asserting that "the script is weak, the characters aren’t particularly fleshed out on the page, and the plot is predictable." He added that "for better and worse, it feels like Beach was recruited to play a role written and designed for a settler. On the one hand, it’s so great to see Beach given so much to work with. As much as things are getting better in Canada, there still aren’t many Indigenous films getting made, and those that do get made are produced on a shoestring budget. There should be opportunities for Indigenous actors beyond that. On the other hand, it’s hard not to be disappointed that the screenplay didn’t adapt at all to the fact that Beach, and thus Ted, is Indigenous."

Awards

At the Vancouver Film Critics Circle Awards 2022, Beach was nominated for Best Actor in a Canadian film and Sullivan was nominated for Best Supporting Actress in a Canadian Film.

References

External links 
 

2022 films
2022 thriller films
English-language Canadian films
Canadian psychological thriller films
2020s English-language films
2020s Canadian films
Films shot in British Columbia